The Speedway Grand Prix of Russia is a speedway event that is a part of the Speedway Grand Prix Series. It was introduced in 2021 Speedway Grand Prix. The first staging was planned for 28 August 2021 at the Anatoly Stepanov Stadium in Tolyatti.

The 2022 edition was cancelled following the 2022 Russian invasion of Ukraine.

Winners

References

Speedway Grands Prix
Speedway competitions in Russia